The College of Arts and Humanities is one of the 13 schools and colleges at the University of Maryland, College Park. It is a liberal arts program that studies human experience, thought, expression, and creativity. It was one of the seven schools established in 1917 by Albert F. Woods.

The College of Arts and Humanities consists of 14 academic departments with 28 academic majors and 33 academic minors. There are 3,549 undergraduate and graduate majors. The College of Arts and Humanities is housed within 12 academic buildings on campus. The college itself is located in Francis Scott Key Hall.

Departments

Leadership

Dean 
The dean of the College of Arts and Humanities is Bonnie Thornton Dill. She is the first woman to become Dean of the College of Arts and Humanities. Dill assumed the position of dean in 2011, and succeeded James Harris.

Dean's Assistant 
Chant'e Ingram was named Assistant to the Dean in 2019. She succeeded Chanel Briscoe.

Rankings 
The University of Maryland, College Park was ranked #52 in arts and humanities by U.S. News and #82 in the World University Ranking for arts and humanities.

Notable alumni 

 Carmen Balthrop, opera singer
 Gail Berman, American businesswoman
 Larry David, American comedian, writer, actor, and television producer
 Jim Henson, American puppeteer
 Munro Leaf, American children's author and illustrator
 Liz Lerman, American choreographer

References

External links 
 
 College of Arts and Humanities records - University of Maryland Libraries
 College of Arts and Humanities official website

Liberal arts colleges in Maryland
University of Maryland, College Park
1917 establishments in Maryland
Educational institutions established in 1917